Families Anonymous (FA) is a twelve-step program for relatives and friends of addicts. FA was founded in 1971 by a group of parents in Southern California concerned with their children's substance abuse. As of 2007 there are FA meetings in more than 20 countries and about 225 regular meetings in the United States. A survey of FA groups in Lisbon, Portugal found members were mostly female, 45–60 years old, and mothers of substance abusing children.

The focus of FA is on supporting members rather than changing the behavior of their friend or relative with a substance abuse problem. Tough love is suggested as an approach to use when dealing with addicts—members do not need to rescue addicts from the consequences of problems the addicts have created, and members should be willing to offend addicts if necessary. One study suggested the therapeutic effects of participation included a process of internalization from the stories and information shared, rationalization and freeing from guilt regarding the behavior of the abuser, and The Traditions protecting anonymity which allow members to reduce potential stigma acquired from membership.

FA's original literature includes the book Today a Better Way on the principles of the FA program, a newsletter, the Twelve Step Rag, as well as several pamphlets and booklets.

See also
Al-Anon/Alateen
Co-Dependents Anonymous
List of twelve-step groups
Nar-Anon

References

External links 
 Families Anonymous Portugal
 Families Anonymous UK 
 Families Anonymous USA
  and 

Addiction organizations in the United States
Twelve-step programs
Organizations established in 1971
Non-profit organizations based in California
1971 establishments in California